Watchhouse in the Carpathians (Hungarian: Őrház a Kárpátokban) is a 1914 Hungarian silent drama film directed by Alexander Korda and Gyula Zilahy and starring Anna Hadrik and Gusztáv Vándory.

Cast
Anna Hadrik 
Gusztáv Vándory

References

External links

Hungarian silent films
Hungarian drama films
Films directed by Alexander Korda
Hungarian black-and-white films
Austro-Hungarian films
1914 drama films
1914 directorial debut films
Silent drama films